Ludwik Zięba (born 5 March 1953) is a Polish biathlete. He competed in the relay event at the 1976 Winter Olympics.

References

1953 births
Living people
Polish male biathletes
Olympic biathletes of Poland
Biathletes at the 1976 Winter Olympics
People from Nowy Targ County